Transitional National Assembly of Rwanda was the unicameral legislature of Rwanda from 1994 to 2003. It was based on Arusha Accords of 1993 following Rwandan Civil War. It had 70 members and it first convened in Kigali on 12 December 1994. 

In 2003, it was replaced by a bicameral Parliament of Rwanda.

Speakers

See also
Politics of Rwanda
History of Rwanda

Sources

Parliament of Rwanda
Government of Rwanda
Rwanda
Rwanda
1994 establishments in Rwanda
2003 disestablishments in Rwanda